The 1934 Southwestern Lynx football team was an American football team that represented Southwestern University—now known as Rhodes College— as a member of the Dixie Conference and the Southern Intercollegiate Athletic Association (SIAA) in the 1934 college football season. Led by Jimmy R. Haygood in fourth and final season as head coach, the team compiled an overall record of 3–6–1 and with a mark of 1–3–1 in Dixie Conference play and 1–1–1 against SIAA competition.

Schedule

References

Southwestern
Southwestern
Rhodes Lynx football seasons
Southwestern Lynx football